Hollingbourne Rural District was a rural district in the county of Kent, England. It was named after the village of Hollingbourne.

Following the Local Government Act 1972, on 1 April 1974 the district was merged with Maidstone Rural District to form the Borough of Maidstone.

Civil parishes 
At the time of its dissolution it consisted of the following civil parishes to the east and southeast of Maidstone:

Bicknor
Boughton Malherbe
Boxley
Bredhurst (part transferred to Gillingham Borough Council in 1933)
Broomfield and Kingswood
Chart Sutton
Detling
East Sutton
Frinsted
Harrietsham
Headcorn
Hollingbourne
Hucking
Langley
Leeds
Lenham
Otterden
Stockbury
Sutton Valence
Thurnham
Ulcombe
Wichling
Wormshill

See also
 Hollingbourne Station
 Hollingbourne Downs
 Mills on Hollingbourne Stream

Districts of England created by the Local Government Act 1894
Districts of England abolished by the Local Government Act 1972
History of Kent
Borough of Maidstone
Rural districts of England